Highway 5 is the easternmost north–south highway in Jordan. It starts at Safawi, from Iraq Highway in the north and ends at the Saudi Arabian border at Mudawwara in the south.

See also
Itenerary on Google maps

Roads in Jordan